The Albania women's national under-16 basketball team is a national basketball team of Albania, administered by the Albanian Basketball Association (FSHB). It represents the country in women's international under-16 basketball competitions.

The team finished 2nd at the 2008 FIBA Europe Under-16 Championship for Women Division C.

See also
Albania women's national basketball team
Albania women's national under-18 basketball team
Albania men's national under-16 basketball team

References

External links
Archived records of Albania team participations

under
Women's national under-16 basketball teams